Basile Rolnin is a French athletics competitor competing in combined events. In 2019, he competed in the men's decathlon at the 2019 World Athletics Championships held in Doha, Qatar. He competed in the 100 metres and he was not able to compete in the other events due to injury.

In 2014, he won the bronze medal in the heptathlon competition at the 2014 French Indoor Athletics Championships held in Bordeaux, France. The following year, he finished in 8th place in the men's decathlon competition at the 2015 European Athletics U23 Championships held in Tallinn, Estonia.

References

External links 
 

Living people
Year of birth missing (living people)
Place of birth missing (living people)
French decathletes
World Athletics Championships athletes for France